The 2014 Mediterranean Athletics U23 Championships was an athletics competition which was held in Aubagne, France, from 14 to 15 June 2014. A total of 42 events were contested, of which 21 by male and 21 by female athletes. A total of 25 nations participated in the championships.

Medal summary

Men

Women

Medal table

Participating countries

References

Mediterranean Athletics U23 Championships
Mediterranean Athletics U23 Championships
Mediterranean Athletics U23 Championships
International athletics competitions hosted by France
June 2014 sports events in France